Tyrese Asante (born 9 April 2002) is a Dutch professional footballer who plays a defender for Eerste Divisie club ADO Den Haag.

Career
Asante left HV & CV Quick for city rivals ADO Den Haag in the summer of 2021. He made his ADO debut on 8 August 2021, in a 2–0 home win against Jong Ajax. Primarily a right back, Asante can also play centre back and got some minutes for ADO Den Haag in midfield during the 2021-22 season. Ahead of the 2022-23 season Asante was given the number 2 shirt number, and a new contract until 2025. On 29 September 2022 Asante scored his first professional goal as his team lost 3-1 at home to Jong PSV in the Eerste Divisie.

References 

2002 births
Living people
Footballers from The Hague
Dutch footballers
Association football defenders
Eerste Divisie players
ADO Den Haag players